Elections to Manchester City Council were held on 10 June 2004.

Due to demographic changes in the Borough since its formation in 1973, and in common with most other English Councils in 2004, substantial boundary changes were implemented in time for these elections. 
Due to these changes, it was necessary for the whole Council to be re-elected for the first time since 1973. Each ward elected three candidates, with the first-placed candidate serving a four-year term of office, expiring in 2008, the second-placed candidate serving a three-year term of office, expiring in 2007, and the third-placed candidate serving a two-year term of office, expiring in 2006. The three Independent Labour candidates stood as "Independent Progressive Labour". Turnout was dramatically improved at 34.3%, up by a third upon the previous election and much higher than the norm set in recent elections of low twenties. The Labour Party retained overall control of the council, but with a majority reduced to the teens for the first time since the 1970s.

Election result

After the election, the composition of the council was as follows:

Ward results
Below is a list of the 32 individual wards with the candidates standing in those wards and the number of votes the candidates acquired. The winning candidates per ward are in bold.

Ancoats and Clayton

Ardwick

Baguley

Bradford

Brooklands

Burnage

Charlestown

Cheetham

Chorlton

Chorlton Park

City Centre

Crumpsall

Didsbury East

Didsbury West

Fallowfield

Gorton North

Gorton South

Harpurhey

Higher Blackley

Hulme

Levenshulme

Longsight

Miles Platting and Newton Heath

Moss Side

Moston

Northenden

Old Moat

Rusholme

Sharston

Whalley Range

Withington

Woodhouse Park

References

2004 English local elections
2004
2000s in Manchester